The following lists events that happened in 1932 in Iceland.

Incumbents
Monarch - Kristján X
Prime Minister – Tryggvi Þórhallsson, Ásgeir Ásgeirsson

Events

Births

30 January – Dagbjartur Grímsson, footballer (d. 1986)
7 July – Ólafur Garðar Einarsson, politician.
16 October – Guðbergur Bergsson, writer
27 November – Elsa G. Vilmundardóttir, geologist (d. 2008)
21 December – Hringur Jóhannesson, painter (d. 1996)

Deaths

References

 
1930s in Iceland
Iceland
Iceland
Years of the 20th century in Iceland